Nassella pulchra, basionym Stipa pulchra, is a species of grass known by the common names purple needlegrass and purple tussockgrass. It is native to the U.S. state of California, where it occurs throughout the coastal hills, valleys, and mountain ranges, as well as the Sacramento Valley and parts of the Sierra Nevada foothills, and Baja California.

It grows in many types of local habitat, including grassland, chaparral, and oak woodland. It grows well on clay and serpentine soils.

Description

The open, nodding inflorescence is up to 60 centimeters long and has many branches bearing Spikelets.

The plant produces copious seed, up to 227 pounds per acre in dense stands. The pointed fruit is purple-tinged when young and has an awn up to 10 centimeters long which is twisted and bent twice. The shape of the seed helps it self-bury.

Uses
This grass is the preferred material used by the California Indian basket weavers for teaching the art of basket weaving.

State grass
Purple needlegrass became the California state grass in 2004. It is considered a symbol of the state because it is viewed by some as one of the most widespread native California grasses, it supported Native American groups as well as Mexican ranchers, and it helps suppress invasive plant species and support native oaks.

Ecology
In addition to supporting native oaks, it supports common branded skipper and Uncas skipper caterpillars.

See also

Native grasses of California

References

External links
Calflora Database: Stipa pulchra (purple needlegrass)
Jepson Manual (TJM93) treatment for Nassella pulchra
Jepson Herbarium: Jepson eFlora (TJM2) Stipa pulchra (purple needlegrass) 
USDA Plants Profile: Nassella pulchra (purple needlegrass)
Grass Manual Treatment: Nassella pulchra
Nassella pulchra — U.C. photo gallery
Stipa pulchra — U.C. photo gallery

pulchra
Bunchgrasses of North America
Native grasses of California
Grasses of Mexico
Flora of Baja California
Flora of the Sierra Nevada (United States)
Natural history of the California chaparral and woodlands
Natural history of the California Coast Ranges
Natural history of the Central Valley (California)
Natural history of the Peninsular Ranges
Natural history of the San Francisco Bay Area
Natural history of the Santa Monica Mountains
Natural history of the Transverse Ranges
Plants described in 1915
Symbols of California